The Poor Act 1575 was a law passed in England under Queen Elizabeth I.  It is a part of the Tudor Poor Laws and a predecessor to the Elizabethan Poor Laws.

The 1575 act required parishes to create “a competent stock of wool, hemp, flax, iron and other stuff” for the poor to work on.  It also created houses of correction where recalcitrant or careless workers could be forced to work and punished accordingly.

The 1575 act built substantially on the Vagabonds Act 1572, and combined, they formed the basis for the subsequent Elizabethan Poor Laws.

References

English Poor Laws
Acts of the Parliament of England (1485–1603)
1575 in law
1575 in England